Olympique de Médéa, also known as 'O Médéa or simply OM for short, is an Algerian football club based in Médéa. The club was founded in 1945 and its colours are orange and blue. Their home stadium, Stade Imam Lyes de Médéa, has a capacity of 12,000 spectators. The club is currently playing in the Algerian Ligue 2.

History
In 1995, the club reached the final of the Algerian Cup for the first time in their history. They opened the scoring in the 45th minute through Kamel Djahmoune but went on to lose the game 2–1.

In 1996, the team had participated in the seventh Arab Cup Winners' Cup in Amman, Jordan. They were unfortunately eliminated in the semi-finals by the Moroccan team Olympique Khouribga despite a fine performance with the final score being 2–1. Olympique Khouribga eventually won the 1996 Arab Cup Winners' Cup beating Al-Faisaly in the final 3–1.

The team managed to get promoted to the Ligue Inter-Régions de football after finishing top of the Ligue Régionale de football de Blida group 11 points clear of second placed RC Arabâ.

They came in fifth-position in the Ligue Inter-Régions de football in the 2009–10 season.

In 2010, the club was listed as a member of the newly professional Ligue Professionnelle 2, because the club had become professional. The club replaced OM Arzew due to them not taking the necessary steps in becoming a professional club. Before JS Kabylie's historical game against Al Ahly in Cairo on 29 August 2010, Olympique de Médéa had the honour of playing JS Kabylie in a friendly match in preparation for the game in Cairo. The friendly was held on the 21 August 2010, at Stade Imam Lyes de Médéa which JS Kabylie won 1–0 with Sofiane Younès breaking the deadlock in the thirty-third minute of the game.

Honours

Domestic competitions
 Algerian Ligue Professionnelle 2
Champion (1): 2015–16
 Algerian Cup:
Runner-up (1): 1994–95

Players

Current squad

Personnel

Current technical staff

Notable players
For details on former players, see :Category:Olympique de Médéa players

References

External links
 Fans Site (Arabic)

 
Football clubs in Algeria
Médéa Province
Association football clubs established in 1945
Algerian Ligue 2 clubs
1945 establishments in Algeria
Sports clubs in Algeria